Lesly is both a given name and a surname. Notable people with the name include:

Given name
Lesly Fellinga (born 1985), Haitian footballer
Lesly Malouda (born 1983), French footballer
Lesly St. Fleur (21st century), Bahamian footballer

Surname
Mark Lesly (born 1959), American actor
Walter Lesly, a fictional character

See also
Lesley (disambiguation)
Leslie (disambiguation)